Lukas Vischer may refer to:
Lukas Vischer (collector) (1780–1840), Swiss traveler and collector 
Lukas Vischer (theologian) (1926–2008), Swiss Reformed ecumenical theologian